Zachry Alexander Brown (born July 31, 1978) is an American singer-songwriter, musician, and co-founder and lead singer of the country–rock Zac Brown Band, as well as electronic dance music group Sir Rosevelt. In 2019, Brown released a pop surprise album titled The Controversy.

Early life
Brown was raised on Lake Lanier by his mother, Bettye, and stepfather Dr. Jody Moses, a dentist in Cumming, Georgia. The eleventh of twelve children, Brown attended Mashburn Elementary School in Cumming; Lakeview Academy in Gainesville, Georgia; and South Forsyth High School in Cumming. He later moved to Dahlonega, Georgia, at age 17, where he graduated from Lumpkin County High School. Brown was given his mother's guitar at age 8, and one of his stepfather's patients was enlisted to teach him classical guitar. He completed two years of lessons, but soon after developed a love for bluegrass music while playing with his father and brother on weekend visits. In his mid-teens, Brown spent almost a year being tutored by a vocal coach from his church

While still in high school, with James Taylor as his inspiration, Brown began playing solo gigs in local venues, performing country and pop cover songs. Brown attended the University of West Georgia, where he became a member of the Zeta Kappa chapter of the Kappa Alpha Order fraternity. He was also a camp counselor at Camp Mikell in Toccoa, Georgia, and Camp Glisson, a United Methodist summer camp and retreat center located in Dahlonega. Brown later founded Camp Southern Ground, a 501c3 non-profit camp in Fayetteville, Georgia.

Other ventures
In 2017, Brown made an investment into the Stillhouse Creek Distillery in Lumpkin County, Georgia, which was later rebranded the Z. Brown Distillery. The distillery closed down on November 18, 2018.

Brown appeared in a 2016 episode of Treehouse Masters on Animal Planet. In 2019, Brown appeared on the Lil Dicky charity single "Earth".

Brown founded Southern Grind Knives, a knife company based out of Peachtree City, Georgia. The company specializes in hard-use tactical knives.

Personal life
In 2016, Brown was involved in an early morning drug bust at the Four Seasons Hotels and Resorts in Palm Beach, Florida. Although Brown was not arrested, police arrested four other individuals for marijuana and cocaine, and found Brown in possession of prescription pills.<ref>{{Cite news|last=Dargan|first=Michele|date=September 1, 2016|title=Singer Zac Brown admits mistake after coke bust at Palm Beach hotel|website=The Palm Beach Post|url=https://www.ajc.com/entertainment/celebrity-news/singer-zac-brown-admits-mistake-after-coke-bust-palm-beach-hotel/bkwTzPjyaQ2kenQjQRjchK/|url-status=live|archive-url=https://web.archive.org/web/20190420182556/https://www.ajc.com/entertainment/celebrity-news/singer-zac-brown-admits-mistake-after-coke-bust-palm-beach-hotel/bkwTzPjyaQ2kenQjQRjchK/|archive-date=April 20, 2019|via=The Atlanta Journal-Constitution}}</ref> Reports stated that there were three strippers in the room at the time of the arrests. Reports also state that the Palm Beach Police Officers did not name Brown in their report because they were fans of his music. Brown later apologized saying that he was, "at the wrong place at the wrong time."

In 2018, Brown and his wife Shelly ended their 12-year marriage. They have four daughters and a son.

Discography

 The Controversy'' (2019)

Album appearances

References

External links
 
 

1978 births
21st-century American guitarists
21st-century American male singers
21st-century American singers
American country banjoists
American country guitarists
American country record producers
American country singer-songwriters
American male guitarists
American male songwriters
American rock guitarists
American rock singers
American rock songwriters
Country musicians from Georgia (U.S. state)
Guitarists from Georgia (U.S. state)
Living people
People from Cumming, Georgia
People from Dahlonega, Georgia
Record producers from Georgia (U.S. state)
University of West Georgia alumni
Zac Brown Band members
Singer-songwriters from Georgia (U.S. state)
United Service Organizations entertainers